Dukes' disease, named after Clement Dukes, also known as fourth disease or Filatov-Dukes' disease (after Nil Filatov), is an exanthem. It is distinguished from measles or forms of rubella, though it was considered as a form of viral rash. Although Dukes identified it as a separate entity, it is thought not to be different from scarlet fever caused by exotoxin-producing Streptococcus pyogenes after Keith Powell proposed equating it with the condition currently known as staphylococcal scalded skin syndrome in 1979.

It was never associated with a specific pathogen, and the terminology is no longer in use. However, a mysterious rash of unknown cause in school children often gives rise to the question of whether it could be Dukes' disease.

Signs and symptoms
Signs and symptoms may include fever, nausea, vomiting, and diarrhea, along with typical viral symptoms of sensitivity to light, enlarged lymph nodes, sore throat, and possibly brain inflammation. The rash may appear at any time during the illness. It is usually generalised. The rash consists of erythematous maculopapules with areas of confluence. They may be urticarial, vesicular, or sometimes petechial. The palms and soles may be involved. The eruptions are more common in children than in adults. Usually, the rash fades without pigmentation or scaling.

Diagnosis

References

External links 

Pediatrics
Scarlet fever